Somnambulist is the second album by experimental, progressive metal band Sicmonic, independently released on September 9, 2008. A signed version was released on December 25, 2009 by Aural Music and it contained four bonus tracks. A music video for "Somnambulist" has been released. After recording the album, guitarist Robert “Bob” Warren parted ways with the band and Josh Ward stepped in to fill rhythm guitar duties.

Promotion
On July 30, 2008 a four song sampler was released. It contained the tracks, Acidic Epiphanies, Somnambulist, No Conscience, Just How Far Down Do You Want To Go?.

Track listing

1
Acidic Epiphanies on the re-issue does not contain hidden tracks and has a run time of 4:35.

Personnel
 Taylor Hession - Vocals
 Ray Goodwin - Lead Guitar, Violin
 Robert "Bob" Warren - Rhythm Guitar
 Jason Williams - Bass
 Zack Sewell - Drums, Percussion
Sean Carr of Lurid State - additional vocals (track 1)

Production
Jim Woodling  engineer
Byron Filson - engineer, mixing, mastering

References

2008 albums
Sicmonic albums